This is a list of butterflies of Thailand. About 1,100 species are known from Thailand.

Papilionidae

Parnassiinae
Bhutanitis lidderdalei ocellatomaculata

Papilioninae

Atrophaneura aidoneus
Atrophaneura sycorax
Atrophaneura varuna
Atrophaneura zaleucus
Byasa adamsoni
Byasa dasarada
Byasa laos
Byasa polyeuctes
Graphium agamemnon
Graphium agetes
Graphium antiphates
Graphium aristeus
Graphium arycles
Graphium bathycles
Graphium chironides
Graphium cloanthus
Graphium delessertii
Graphium doson
Graphium eurous
Graphium eurypylus
Graphium evemon
Graphium glycerion
Graphium macareus
Graphium megarus
Graphium nomius
Graphium ramaceus
Graphium sarpedon
Graphium xenocles
Lamproptera curius
Lamproptera meges
Losaria coon
Losaria neptunus
Meandrusa payeni
Meandrusa sciron
Pachliopta aristolochiae
Papilio agestor
Papilio alcmenor
Papilio arcturus
Papilio bianor
Papilio clytia
Papilio demoleus
Papilio demolion
Papilio dialis
Papilio epycides
Papilio helenus
Papilio iswara
Papilio mahadeva
Papilio memnon
Papilio nephelus
Papilio noblei
Papilio palinurus
Papilio paradoxa
Papilio paris
Papilio pitmani
Papilio polyctor
Papilio polytes
Papilio prexaspes
Papilio protenor
Papilio slateri
Teinopalpus imperialis
Troides aeacus
Troides amphrysus
Troides helena

Pieridae

Pierinae
Aporia agathon
Appias albina 
Appias cardena
Appias indra 
Appias lalage 
Appias lalassis 
Appias libythea 
Appias lyncida 
Appias nero 
Appias pandione 
Appias paulina 
Cepora iudith 
Cepora nadina 
Cepora nerissa 
Delias acalis 
Delias agoranis
Delias agostina
Delias belladonna 
Delias berinda  
Delias descombesi 
Delias hyparete
Delias lativitta
Delias ninus 
Delias pasithoe
Delias patrua
Delias sanaca 
Delias singhapura 
Hebomoia glaucippe 
Ixias pyrene 
Leptosia nina 
Pareronia avatar 
Pareronia hippia
Pareronia valeria 
Phrissura aegis 
Pieris brassicae
Pieris canidia 
Pieris napi 
Pontia daplidice 
Prioneris philonome 
Prioneris thestylis 
Saletara liberia

Coliadinae
Catopsilia pomona 
Catopsilia pyranthe 
Catopsilia scylla 
Dercas verhuelli 
Eurema ada
Eurema andersonii
Eurema blanda
Eurema brigitta
Eurema hecabe
Eurema lacteola
Eurema laeta
Eurema pallida
Eurema sari
Eurema simulatrix
Eurema tilaha
Gandaca harina

Nymphalidae

Danainae
Danaus affinis 
Danaus chrysippus 
Danaus genutia
Danaus melanippus 
Euploea algea 
Euploea camaralzeman 
Euploea core 
Euploea crameri 
Euploea doubledayi 
Euploea eunice
Euploea eyndhovii 
Euploea midamus 
Euploea modesta 
Euploea mulciber 
Euploea phaenareta 
Euploea radamanthus 
Euploea sylvester 
Euploea tulliolus 
Idea hypermnestra 
Idea leuconoe 
Idea lynceus 
Idea stolli 
Ideopsis gaura 
Ideopsis similis
Ideopsis vulgaris 
Parantica aglea 
Parantica agleoides 
Parantica aspasia 
Parantica melaneus 
Parantica pedonga 
Parantica sita 
Tirumala gautama 
Tirumala limniace 
Tirumala septentrionis

Satyrinae
Callerebia annada 
Callerebia narasing 
Coelites epiminthia 
Coelites euptychioides 
Coelites nothis 
Elymnias casiphone 
Elymnias dara 
Elymnias esaca 
Elymnias hypermnestra 
Elymnias malelas 
Elymnias nesaea 
Elymnias obnubila 
Elymnias panthera 
Elymnias patna
Elymnias penanga 
Elymnias vasudeva 
Erites angularis
Erites argentina 
Erites falcipennis 
Erites medura 
Ethope diademoides 
Ethope himachala 
Ethope noirei 
Lethe bhairava 
Lethe chandica
Lethe confusa 
Lethe distans 
Lethe dura 
Lethe europa 
Lethe gulnihal 
Lethe kansa 
Lethe latiaris 
Lethe mekara 
Lethe minerva 
Lethe naga 
Lethe rohria 
Lethe sidereal
Lethe sinorix 
Lethe sura 
Lethe verma 
Lethe vindhya 
Mandarinia regalis 
Melanitis leda 
Melanitis phedima 
Melanitis zitenius 
Mycalesis adamsoni 
Mycalesis anapita 
Mycalesis anaxias 
Mycalesis anaxiodes 
Mycalesis annamitica 
Mycalesis deficiens 
Mycalesis distanti
Mycalesis francisca 
Mycalesis fusca 
Mycalesis gotama 
Mycalesis intermedia 
Mycalesis janardana
Mycalesis lepcha 
Mycalesis maianeas 
Mycalesis malsara 
Mycalesis mineus 
Mycalesis mnasicles 
Mycalesis nicotia 
Mycalesis oroatis 
Mycalesis orseis 
Mycalesis perseoides 
Mycalesis perseus 
Mycalesis sangaica
Mycalesis suaveolens 
Mycalesis thailandica 
Mycalesis visala 
Neope armandii 
Neope muirheadi 
Neope pulaha 
Neorina crishna 
Neorina hila 
Neorina lowii 
Orinoma damaris 
Orsotriaena medus 
Penthema binghami
Penthema darlisa
Ragadia crisilda 
Ragadia critias 
Ragadia makutasiponta 
Xanthotaenia busiris 
Ypthima affectata 
Ypthima akbar 
Ypthima baldus 
Ypthima confuse 
Ypthima dohertyi 
Ypthima evansi 
Ypthima fasciata
Ypthima horsfieldii
Ypthima huebneri
Ypthima humei
Ypthima lisandra
Ypthima norma
Ypthima pandocus
Ypthima sacra
Ypthima savara  
Ypthima similis 
Ypthima sobrina 
Ypthima watsoni
Ypthima yunosukei

Amathusiinae
Aemona lena 
Amathusia binghami 
Amathusia masina
Amathusia ochraceofusca 
Amathusia phidippus 
Amathuxidia amythaon 
Discophora deo 
Discophora necho 
Discophora sondaica 
Discophora timora 
Enispe intermedia
Faunis canens 
Faunis eumeus
Faunis gracilis
Faunis kirata
Melanocyma faunula 
Stichophthalma camadeva 
Stichophthalma cambodia 
Stichophthalma godfreyi 
Stichophthalma louisa 
Thaumantis diores 
Thaumantis klugius 
Thaumantis noureddin
Thaumantis odana 
Thauria aliris 
Zeuxidia amethystus 
Zeuxidia aurelius 
Zeuxidia doubledayi

Heliconiinae
Acraea issoria 
Acraea violae 
Argynnis childreni 
Argynnis hyperbius 
Cethosia biblis 
Cethosia cyane 
Cethosia hypsea 
Cethosia penthesilea 
Cirrochroa aoris 
Cirrochroa emalea 
Cirrochroa orissa 
Cirrochroa satellite 
Cirrochroa surya 
Cirrochroa tyche 
Cupha erymanthis 
Paduca fasciata 
Phalanta alcippe 
Phalanta phalantha 
Terinos atlita
Terinos clarissa
Terinos terpander
Vagrans egista 
Vindula dejone
Vindula erota

Nymphalinae
Ariadne ariadne 
Ariadne isaeus 
Ariadne merione 
Ariadne specularia 
Chersonesia intermedia 
Chersonesia peraka 
Chersonesia rahria 
Chersonesia risa 
Cyrestis cocles 
Cyrestis nivea 
Cyrestis themire 
Cyrestis thyodamas 
Doleschallia bisaltide
Hypolimnas bolina 
Hypolimnas misippus 
Junonia almana 
Junonia atlites 
Junonia hierta 
Junonia iphita 
Junonia lemonias 
Junonia orithya 
Kallima inachus
Kallima knyvetti
Kallima limborgii
Kaniska canace 
Laringa castelnaui 
Laringa horsfieldi 
Polygonia c-album 
Polygonia c-aureum 
Rhinopalpa polynice 
Symbrenthia hippoclus
Symbrenthia hypatia 
Symbrenthia hypselis 
Symbrenthia liaea 
Vanessa cardui 
Vanessa indica 
Yoma sabina

Limenitidinae
Athyma asura 
Athyma cama 
Athyma clerica 
Athyma kanwa 
Athyma larymna 
Athyma nefte 
Athyma opalina
Athyma perius 
Athyma pravara
Athyma punctata 
Athyma ranga 
Athyma reta 
Athyma selenophora 
Athyma zeroca 
Auzakia danava 
Bhagadatta austenia 
Euthalia aconthea 
Euthalia adonia
Euthalia alpheda 
Euthalia anosia 
Euthalia byakko
Euthalia djata 
Euthalia dunya 
Euthalia eriphylae
Euthalia evelina 
Euthalia franciae 
Euthalia ipona
Euthalia kanda
Euthalia lubentina 
Euthalia mahadeva
Euthalia malaccana 
Euthalia merta
Euthalia monina 
Euthalia nara 
Euthalia narayana 
Euthalia patala 
Euthalia phemius
Euthalia recta 
Euthalia teuta 
Euthalia whiteheadi 
Lebadea martha 
Lexias canescens 
Lexias cyanipardus 
Lexias dirtea 
Lexias pardalis 
Limenitis daraxa 
Limenitis dudu
Limenitis houlberti
Moduza procris
Neptis ananta 
Neptis anjana 
Neptis armandia 
Neptis aurelia 
Neptis bieti 
Neptis cartica 
Neptis clinia 
Neptis columella 
Neptis dindinga 
Neptis duryodana 
Neptis harita 
Neptis heliodore 
Neptis hordonia 
Neptis hylas 
Neptis ilira 
Neptis jumbah 
Neptis leucoporos 
Neptis Magadha 
Neptis manasa 
Neptis miah 
Neptis monata 
Neptis namba 
Neptis narayana 
Neptis nashona
Neptis nata 
Neptis omeroda 
Neptis paraka  
Neptis radha 
Neptis sandaka 
Neptis sankara 
Neptis sappho 
Neptis soma 
Neptis tiga 
Neptis viraja 
Neptis yerburii 
Neptis zaida 
Neurosigma siva 
Pandita sinope 
Parthenos sylvia
Tanaecia aruna 
Tanaecia clathrata
Tanaecia cocytus 
Tanaecia flora 
Tanaecia godartii 
Tanaecia iapis 
Tanaecia jahnu 
Tanaecia julii 
Tanaecia lepidea 
Tanaecia munda
Tanaecia palguna
Tanaecia pelea 
Tanaecia telchinia

Apaturinae
Apatura ambica 
Apatura chevana 
Dichorragia nesimachus 
Eulaceura osteria 
Euripus consimilis 
Euripus nyctelius 
Heleyra hemina 
Herona marathus 
Herona sumatrana 
Hestina nama 
Hestina persimilis 
Pseudergolis wedah
Rohana nakula 
Rohana parisatis 
Rohana parvata
Rohana tonkiniana 
Sephisa chandra 
Stibochiona nicea

Charaxinae
Agatasa calydonia 
Chraxes aristogiton 
Chraxes bernardus 
Chraxes distanti
Chraxes durnfordi 
Chraxes kahruba 
Chraxes marmax 
Chraxes solon 
Polyura arja 
Polyura athamas 
Polyura delphis
Polyura dolon 
Polyura eudamippus 
Polyura franck 
Polyura hebe 
Polyura jalysus 
Polyura moori 
Polyura nepenthes 
Polyura schreiber

Calinaginae
Calinaga buddha

Libytheinae
Libythea celtis 
Libythea geoffroyi 
Libythea myrrha 
Libythea narina

Lycaenidae

Poritiinae
Cyaniriodes libna 
Deramas jasoda 
Deramas livens
Poritia erycinoides 
Poritia hewitsoni 
Poritia phama 
Poritia philota 
Poritia plateni 
Poritia sumatrae 
Simiskina pasira 
Simiskina phalena 
Simiskina phalia 
Simiskina pharyge 
Simiskina proxima

Miletinae
Liphyra brassolis 
Allotinus advidis 
Allotinus drumila 
Allotinus felderi 
Allotinus horsfieldi 
Allotinus leogoron 
Allotinus substrigosa 
Allotinus subviolaceus 
Allotinus taras 
Allotinus unicolor 
Caleta decidia 
Caleta elna 
Caleta roxus 
Castalius rosimon 
Discolampa ethion 
Everes argiades 
Everes hugelii 
Everes lacturnnus 
Logania malayica 
Logania marmorata 
Logania massalia 
Logania regina 
Miletus ancon 
Miletus biggsii 
Miletus chinensis 
Miletus croton 
Miletus gallus 
Miletus gopara 
Miletus mallus 
Miletus nymphis 
Miletus symethus 
Spalgis epius 
Taraka hamada 
Taraka mahanetra
Tarucus callinara

Polyommatinae
Acytolepis cossaea 
Acytolepis puspa 
Anthene emolus 
Anthene lycaenina 
Azanus urios 
Bothrinia chennelli
Catochrysops panormus 
Catochrysops strabo 
Catopyrops ancyra 
Celastrina argiolus 
Celastrina lavendularis
Celastrina pellecebra 
Celastrina transpecta 
Celatoxia marginata 
Chilades lajus 
Euchrysops cnejus 
Freyeria putli 
Freyeria trochylus 
Ionolyce helicon 
Jamides abdul 
Jamides alecto 
Jamides bochus 
Jamides caeruleus 
Jamides celeno 
Jamides cunilda 
Jamides cyta 
Jamides elpis 
Jamides malaccanus 
Jamides parasaturatus 
Jamides philatus 
Jamides pura 
Jamides talinga
Jamides zebra 
Lampides boeticus 
Luthrodes pandava
Lycaenopsis haraldus 
Megisba malaya
Nacaduba angusta 
Nacaduba berenice 
Nacaduba beroe 
Nacaduba calauria 
Nacaduba hermus 
Nacaduba kurava 
Nacaduba pactolus 
Nacaduba pavana 
Nacaduba sanaya 
Nacaduba subperusia 
Neopithecops zalmora 
Niphanda asialis 
Niphanda cymbia 
Niphanda tessellate 
Orthomiella pontis 
Petrelaea dana 
Pithcops corvus 
Prosotas aluta 
Prosotas dubiosa 
Prosotas gracilis 
Prosotas lutea 
Prosotas nora 
Prosotas noreia 
Prosotas pia 
Shijimia moorei
Syntarucus plinius 
Talicada nyseus 
Tongeia potanini 
Udara dilecta 
Udara placidula 
Udara Selma 
Una usta 
Zizeeria karandra
Zizeeria maha
Zizina otis
Zizula hylax

Lycaeninae
Heliophorus androcles 
Heliophorus brahma 
Heliophorus epicles 
Heliophorus hybrida 
Heliophorus ila	 
Heliophorus indicus

Theclinae
Amblypodia anita 
Amblypodia narada 
Ancema blanka
Ancema ctesia 
Apporasa atkinsoni 
Araotes Iapithis 
Arhopala aberrans 
Arhopala abseus 
Arhopala ace 
Arhopala aedias 
Arhopala aeeta 
Arhopala agaba 
Arhopala agelastus 
Arhopala agesilaus 
Arhopala agrata 
Arhopala aida
Arhopala alaconia 
Arhopala alax 
Arhopala alesia
Arhopala alitaeus 
Arhopala allata 
Arhopala amantes 
Arhopala ammon 
Arhopala ammonides  
Arhopala amphimuta 
Arhopala anarte 
Arhopala anthelus 
Arhopala antimuta 
Arhopala ariana
Arhopala ariel 
Arhopala aroa 
Arhopala arvina
Arhopala asinarus
Arhopala asopia  
Arhopala athada 
Arhopala atosia 
Arhopala atrax 
Arhopala auretia 
Arhopala avatha
Arhopala barami 
Arhopala bazaloides 
Arhopala bazalus 
Arhopala birmana 
Arhopala buddha 
Arhopala camdeo 
Arhopala catori
Arhopala cleander 
Arhopala corinda 
Arhopala delta 
Arhopala democritus 
Arhopala dispar 
Arhopala elopura
Arhopala epimete 
Arhopala epimuta 
Arhopala eumolphus 
Arhopala evansi 
Arhopala fulla 
Arhopala havilandi
Arhopala hellenore 
Arhopala horsfieldi 
Arhopala hypomuta 
Arhopala ijauensis 
Arhopala inornata
Arhopala khamti 
Arhopala labuana 
Arhopala lurida 
Arhopala major
Arhopala metanmuta 
Arhopala milleri
Arhopala moolaiana 
Arhopala moorei
Arhopala muta
Arhopala myrzala
Arhopala nicevillei
Arhopala normani 
Arhopala oenea 
Arhopala opalina 
Arhopala paraganesa 
Arhopala paralea 
Arhopala paramuta 
Arhopala perimuta 
Arhopala phaenops
Arhopala phanda
Arhopala pseudocentaurus 
Arhopala pseudomuta 
Arhopala rama 
Arhopala selta 
Arhopala silhetensis 
Arhopala similis 
Arhopala singla 
Arhopala sublustris
Arhopala vihara 
Arhopala wildeyana
Arhopala zambra 
Artipe eryx
Bindahara phocides 
Britomartis cleoboides 
Bullis stigmata 
Catapaecilma elegans 
Catapaecilma major 
Catapaecilma subochrea 
Charana mandarina 
Cheritra freja
Cheritrella truncipennis 
Chilaria kina
Chilaria othona
Chrysozephyrus sikkimensis 
Cowania achaja 
Creon cleobis 
Dacalana burmana 
Dacalana cotys 
Dacalana penicilligera 
Dacalana sinhara 
Deudorix elioti
Deudorix epijarbas
Deudorix hypargyria
Drina donina 
Drina maneia
Drupadia estella 
Drupadia johorensis 
Drupadia ravindra 
Drupadia rufotaenia 
Drupadia scaeva 
Drupadia theda
Eooxylides tharis 
Flos adriana 
Flos anniella 
Flos areste 
Flos asoka 
Flos diardi 
Flos fulgida 
Flos fulgida 
Horaga onyx 
Horaga syrinx 
Horage amethysta 
Hypochrysops coelisparsus 
Hypolycaena amabilis 
Hypolycaena erylus
Hypolycaena merguia 
Hypolycaena thecloides 
Iraota distanti 
Iraota rochana 
Iraota timoleon 
Jacoona anasuja 
Loxura atymnus 
Loxura cassiopeia 
Mahathala ameria 
Mantoides gama 
Mantoides hypoleuca 
Mota massyla 
Neocheritra amrita 
Neocheritra fabronia 
Neomyrina nivea
Pratapa deva 
Pratapa icetas 
Pratapa icetoides 
Pseudotajuria donatana 
Purlisa gigantea 
Rachana jalindra 
Rapala abonormis 
Rapala damona
Rapala dieneces 
Rapala domitia 
Rapala elcia 
Rapala iarbus 
Rapala manea 
Rapala nissa 
Rapala pheretima 
Rapala reclivitta 
Rapala refulgens
Rapala scintilla
Rapala suffusa 
Rapala varuna 
Remelana jangala 
Semanga superba 
Sinthusa chandrana 
Sinthusa malika 
Sinthusa nasaka 
Sithon nedymond 
Suasa lisides 
Surendra florimel 
Surendra quercetorum 
Surendra vivarna 
Tajuria cippus 
Tajuria culta 
Tajuria deudorix 
Tajuria diaeus 
Tajuria isaeus 
Tajuria maculata 
Tajuria mantra 
Tajuria yajna 
Thaduka multicaudata 
Thamala marciana 
Ticherra acte 
Virachola isocrates 
Virachola kessuma 
Virachola perse
Virachola rubida 
Yasoda androconifera 
Yasoda pita 
Yasoda tripunctata 
Zeltus amasa
Zinaspa todara

Aphnaeinae
Cigaritis lohita 
Cigaritis maximus 
Cigaritis seliga 
Cigaritis syama 
Cigaritis vixinga 
Cigaritis vulcanus

Curetinae
Curetis acuta 
Curetis bulis 
Curetis dentata
Curetis insularis 
Curetis regula 
Curetis santana 
Curetis saronis 
Curetis sperthis
Curetis tagalica

Riodinidae
Abisara abonormis 
Abisara bifasciata 
Abisara burnii 
Abisara echerius 
Abisara freda 
Abisara fylla 
Abisara kausambi 
Abisara neophron 
Abisara saturata 
Abisara savitri 
Dodona deodata 
Dodona dipoea 
Dodona donira 
Dodona egeon
Dodona eugenes
Dodona ouida 
Laxita thuisto 
Paralaxita damajanti 
Paralaxita orphna 
Paralaxita telesia 
Striboges nymphidia 
Taxila haquinus 
Zemeros emesoides 
Zemeros flegyas

Hesperiidae

Coeliadinae
Badamia exclamationis 
Bibasis amara 
Bibasis anadi 
Bibasis etelka 
Bibasis gomata
Bibasis harisa 
Bibasis iluska 
Bibasis jaina 
Bibasis oedipodea 
Bibasis sena 
Bibasis vasutana 
Choaspes benjaminii 
Choaspes hemixanthus
Choaspes plateni 
Choaspes subcaudatus 
Choaspes xanthopogon 
Hasora anura 
Hasora badra 
Hasora chromus 
Hasora danda 
Hasora khoda 
Hasora proxissima 
Hasora salanga 
Hasora schoenherr 
Hasora taminatus 
Hasora vitta 
Hasora vitta 
Hasora zoma

Pyrginae
Capila hainana 
Capila phanaeus 
Caprona agama
Caprona alida 
Celaenorrhinus andamanicus 
Celaenorrhinus asmara
Celaenorrhinus aurivittatus  
Celaenorrhinus dhanada 
Celaenorrhinus ficulnea 
Celaenorrhinus inaequalis 
Celaenorrhinus ladana 
Celaenorrhinus leucocera 
Celaenorrhinus munda 
Celaenorrhinus nigricans 
Celaenorrhinus patula 
Celaenorrhinus pero 
Celaenorrhinus pinratanai 
Celaenorrhinus putra 
Chamunda chamunda 
Coladenia agni 
Coladenia buchananii 
Coladenia indrani 
Coladenia laxmi 
Ctenoptilum multiguttatum 
Ctenoptilum vasava 
Darpa hanria 
Darpa pteria 
Darpa striata 
Gerosis bhagava 
Gerosis limax 
Gerosis phisara
Lobocla liliana 
Mooreana trichoneura 
Odina decorata 
Odina hieroglyphica 
Odontoptilum angulatum 
Odontoptilum pygela 
Pintara pinwilli
Pseudocoladenia dan 
Sarangesa dasahara 
Satarupa gopala 
Seseria affinis
Seseria sambara 
Seseria strigata 
Spialia galba
Tagiades calligana 
Tagiades cohaereus
Tagiades gana 
Tagiades japetus 
Tagiades lavatus
Tagiades litigiosus 
Tagiades menaka 
Tagiades parra gala
Tagiades toba 
Tagiades ultra
Tapena thawaitesi

Hesperiinae
Matapa sasivarna
Acerbas anthea
Acerbas martini
Aeromachus pygmaeus 
Aeromachus stigmatus 
Ampittia dioscorides 
Ampittia maroides
Ancistroiedes armatus 
Ancistroiedes gemmifer 
Ancistroiedes nigrita 
Apostictopterus fuliginosus 
Arnetta atkinsoni 
Arnetta verones 
Astictopterus jama 
Baoris farri
Baoris oceia
Baoris pagana
Baoris penicillata
Borbo bevani
Borbo cinnara
Caltoris bromus
Caltoris brunnea
Caltoris cahira
Caltoris cormasa
Caltoris kumara
Caltoris Malaya
Caltoris plebeia
Caltoris sirius
Caltoris tenuis
Caltoris tulsi
Cephrenes chrysozona
Cupitha purreea 
Cyrina cyrina
Eetion elia
Erionota acroleuca
Erionota sybirita
Erionota thrax
Erionota torus
Gangara lebadea
Gangara thysis
Ge geta
Halpe arcuata
Halpe aurifera 
Halpe burmana 
Halpe elana
Halpe flava 
Halpe hauxwelli
Halpe insignis 
Halpe kusala
Halpe ormenes 
Halpe pelethronix
Halpe porus 
Halpe sikkima 
Halpe toxopea
Halpe wantona
Halpe zema 
Halpe zola
Hidari irava
Hyarotis adrastus
Hyarotis iadera
Hyarotis microsticta
Iambrix salsala 
Iambrix stellifer 
Idmon distanti 
Idmon obiquans 
Isma bononia
Isma feralia
Isma guttulifera
Isma kuala
Isma miosticta
Isma obscura
Isma protoclea
Isma umbrosa
Iton semamora
Iton watsonii
Koruthaialos butleri 
Koruthaialos rubecula 
Koruthaialos sindu 
Lotongus avesta
Lotongus calathus
Lotongus sarala
Matapa aria
Matapa cresta
Matapa druma
Notocrypta clavata 
Notocrypta curvifascia
Notocrypta feisthamelii 
Notocrypta paralysos 
Notocrypta pria 
Ochlodes brahma
Ochlodes siva
Ochus subvittatus 
Oerane microthyrus
Onryza albipecta 
Onryza siamica
Oriens gola
Oriens goloides
Oriens paragola
Parnara ganga
Parnara guttata
Parnara naso
Pelopidas agna
Pelopidas assamensis
Pelopidas conjunctus
Pelopidas mathias
Pelopidas subochraceus
Pemara pugnans
Pinthauria marsena 
Pinthauria murdava 
Pinthauria stranmineipennis 
Pirdana distanti
Pirdana hyela
Plastingia naga
Plastingia pellonia
Polytremis annama
Polytremis discreta
Polytremis eltola
Polytremis lubricans
Polytremis minuta
Potanthus confucius
Potanthus flavus
Potanthus ganda
Potanthus hetaerus
Potanthus juno
Potanthus Lydia
Potanthus mingo
Potanthus nesta
Potanthus omaha
Potanthus pallida
Potanthus palnia
Potanthus parvus
Potanthus pseudomaesa
Potanthus recifasciatus
Potanthus trachala
Pseudokerana fulgur
Psolos fuligo 
Pyroneura callineura
Pyroneura derna
Pyroneura flavia
Pyroneura helena
Pyroneura latoia
Pyroneura margherita
Pyroneura niasana
Pyroneura perakana
Quedara monteithi 
Salanoemia fuscicornis
Salanoemia sala
Salanoemia tavoyana
Scobura cephala 
Scobura cephaloides 
Scobura isota 
Scobura phiditia 
Scobura woolletti
Sebastonyma pudens 
Sovia albipecta
Suada swerga 
Suastus everyx 
Suastus gremius 
Suastus minutus 
Taractrocera archias
Taractrocera maevius
Taractrocera ziclea
Telicota augias
Telicota bambusae
Telicota besta
Telicota colon
Telicota Hilda
Telicota linna
Telicota ohara
Thoressa cerata 
Thoressa masoni 
Udaspes folus 
Unkana ambasa
Unkana flava
Unkana mytheca
Xanthoneura corissa
Zela adorabilis
Zela elioti
Zela smaragdinus
Zela zeus
Zographetus ogygia 
Zographetus ogygioides
Zographetus rama 
Zographetus satwa
Zongraphetus doxus

See also 
 List of species native to Thailand
 List of ants of Thailand
 List of beetles of Thailand

References

External links
Futao ISSN 0916-1112 Series website
Basic list of Butterflies in Chiang Mai province, Thailand
Wing Scales: Butterflies of Thailand

Thailand
Thailand
 But
Butterflies